Grant School or Ulysses S. Grant School may refer to:

Hong Kong
Grant School (Hong Kong)

United States
 Grant High School (disambiguation), several places
Ulysses Simpson Grant Elementary School, a historic building in Oskaloosa, Iowa
 Grant School (St. Louis, Missouri), listed on the NRHP in St. Louis, Missouri
 Grant School (Zanesville, Ohio), listed on the NRHP in Muskingum County, Ohio
Ulysses S. Grant School (Washington, D.C.), a historic high school in Washington, D.C.